Resistbot is a service that people in the United States can use to compose and send letters to elected officials from the messaging apps on their mobile phones, with the goal being that the task can be completed in "under two minutes". It identifies a user's federal, state, and city elected officials, then provides an electronic service to deliver to those officials, as well as to local newspapers, and to publish online. As the platform has developed, Resistbot has added functionality such as confirming voter registrations, locating town halls, finding volunteer opportunities, and locating polling places. Resistbot has been funded by over 24,000 small-dollar donations as of September 12, 2017, and is built and maintained by volunteers.

History 
Resistbot was established by Eric Ries and Jason Putorti in January 2017. Jason Putorti attended the University of Pittsburgh where he graduated with a BS in computer science. Before launching Resistbot, he served as the designer at AngelList and previously co-founded Causes and Votizen. He expresses that one of his goals in creating Resistbot was to create a universal way to increase civic engagement and civic education. Though the program was founded to oppose the actions of the Trump administration, it functions as an unbiased channel, allowing users to compose their own messages. Unlike many other advocacy efforts, it provides no scripts to users. Donations from users pay for postage for letters and voter registration forms, faxes and calls to officials, and texts between the users and the service. When Resistbot began, letters were faxed to officials' offices. However, as the program received more heavy usage, and officials started to unplug their fax machines, it switched to electronic delivery as a primary channel, with faxes, postal letters, and hand deliveries as secondary methods. The first states that had access to Resistbot's feature of texting one's state legislature were Arizona, California, Florida, Maryland, New Jersey, Ohio, Oklahoma, South Carolina, Texas, Utah, and Washington. Between June 21 and 22, 2018 alone, Resistbot volunteers delivered 12,781 letters to the U.S. Senate, largely about family separation. Those letters represented only a small sample of deliveries overall. Within five months of launch Resistbot had 730,000 users, by six months 1 million, and after fifteen months 4.5 million.

How Resistbot works 
Users text one of many keywords to 50409, and respond to what the bot texts back. If a user wants to write to their officials, Resistbot will ask for their address to find out who represents them, ask for the user to type out the letter they want to send, and deliver the message via electronic delivery, fax, or postal mail, depending on what method is available. Users may also use iMessage, Facebook Messenger, Twitter, or Telegram to use the service. Resistbot is free to use, and does not require an app download.

Usage and reception 
Resistbot has been featured on many news and magazine sites including Recode, Teen Vogue, Fast Company, Engadget, GOOD Magazine, The Guardian, The Miami Herald, and Huffington Post. In an interview with Recode, Putorti acknowledged that though the product's main purpose was to voice those in opposition to the Trump Presidency, the system delivers all messages without regard to political views. Resistbot's Twitter feed features many responses by members of Congress to users who have sent messages through the software. It was called, "The Most Genius Thing Of 2017" by GOOD magazine.

In April 2017 Resistbot added a feature called "Letters to the Editor". This feature allows users to choose to send their message both to their elected official, and directly to a local newspaper or media source in their area. This allows the message they wrote to get seen by their communities and can help them gain support for their cause, potentially leading to more people texting Resistbot about this cause.

During the congressional recess in August 2017, Resistbot helped to facilitate what they called flash-mobs. When members of congress were refusing to attend town hall meetings, Resistbot encouraged users to organize or protest in order to help gain support for their causes.

In November 2017, Resistbot was used as a channel by Medium to push Net Neutrality letters to Congress. The article published seven letter templates for readers to send to their representatives in favor of net neutrality. Individuals couldn't send a message to the FCC or its commissioners, only the elected officials who attend to the address that the user enters into the prompts. In January 2018, The Peace Report published an article pushing its users to send letters to government officials through Resistbot in order to oppose the construction of two new military bases in Okinawa. The article contained a letter template for readers to copy and paste to Congress representatives. In February 2018, WUSA TV fact checked and verified that texting "NRA" to Resistbot would tell users how their officials had benefited, or been hurt by, NRA contributions. In September 2018, InStyle Magazine listed it as a way to "make your voice heard," regarding the nomination of Brett Kavanaugh.

In 2020, Resistbot was cited as a way to help save the United States Postal Service by Mashable, New York (magazine), and Vogue (magazine). The "widespread claims" were fact-checked by Snopes, which tested the service and wrote, "the process took around five minutes with the only significant delay coming when the user awaits a verification code sent to their email address. Snopes could confirm that the letter was sent to the representatives in question because the office of one of them, U.S. Rep. Matt Cartwright, D-Pennsylvania, happened to respond later on with an acknowledgement that explicitly addressed the topic of the letter..."

Academic studies 
During the 2018 midterms, Analyst Institute ran an academic control-group study on Resistbot. The authors wrote that the voter turnout program, "was highly cost-effective and able to generate an impressive number of net voters, surpassing the performance of many other programs in midterm election cycles." In another study, Dr. Christopher Mann, Ph. D. wrote in the Journal of Experimental Political Science that Resistbot, "increased turnout by 1.8 percentage points in a 2019 election".

Resistbot's progress and future 
Resistbot is able to offer a program that can allow for normal-day citizens to get in contact with a representative to have one on one conversations about government concerns/issues. The fears of many have been subsided because they can now go to a person who is informed and in power in order to get a better view of issues rather than looking at the mispread of information on various media sources. However, there is one new fear as a result of this system which is being scammed due to its technological qualities.

The older generation and even some from this current generation are having a hard time adjusting to the switch from in-person to online which is why simplicity in technology platforms is useful. In a primary example of simple technology usage, right after Ruth Bader Ginsburg passed, Resistbot had a message that said if you texted RBG to their number, then this would be counted as a vote for delaying the replacement of the new Supreme Court nomination. However, the general public was convinced that this could be a scam, it seemed too easy and unreliable to actually place a vote towards such a big issue. The message was then later verified as not a scam, but once fully verified on Snopes, their time window to vote had already been shut. This issue of people not knowing what is a scam and what isn't is important when looking at a company that solely relies on human action and trust.

A reason why Resistbot is easy to use is due to the easy access of sending a text. Texting has become more and more frequent, Jason Putorti, the executive director of Resistbot stated that the reason their system uses texting is due to how immediate the responses can get read and sent. Texting is a medium that not all people trust, due to such a large network of scam within the country especially political related, even corporations like local news warn against replying to political texts. Texting is such a large source of communication and can be spun out of control when personal numbers are leaked to phone books and businesses. For example, when interviewing a lady from Arizona, she displayed her concern for how a business like Resistbot retrieved her number and what database it could be leaked into.

Jason Putorti mentions how in-person interaction will continue to be much more limited due to the result of the COVID-19 pandemic.  The pandemic highlighted how important civic technologies are and how important it is for them to grow just like Resistbot has. Resistbot created an efficient way to spread the voter's ideas to a representative, rather than be an email that goes left in the unread pile and eventually moved to the trash. A problem occurs when scam businesses try to imitate Resistbot; the Federal Trade Commission has come out and said that if any sort of text starts asking for personal information such as bank account information, then it should be avoided.Resistbot is currently working on ways to improve its trust with its users.

Despite the legitimacy concerns, Resistbot has proven that it is useful in modern day issues. Due to White House Offices being slammed with calls and letters due to the 2020 election, many people are unable to schedule calls and in-person visits. Resistbot is able to save time and still convey the message needed to be said to representatives, a quick text is all that is necessary. A way that Resistbot is making an effort to be personal despite the lack of a face to face conversation is that Resistbot does not offer any scripts or pre-planned letters.  This gives the voter and representative a bit more faith that this process is legitimate. The app plans to add more additions to its system such as an event map for town hall meetings and scheduled Congress phone calls. The app is adamant about growing and creating a platform that is trusted as well as useful to the daily citizen.

Criticisms and challenges  
In March 2017, Micah L. Sifry wrote, "making it easier to digitally contact your Member of Congress paradoxically makes it more likely that they will discount the value of your opinion," in a criticism of the service. Lee Drutman similarly wrote, "these services and technologies are cheapening the meaning of civic engagement by turning it into a commodity..."

In September 2017, during the political fight over health care, Eric Ries told Business Insider, "if I didn't read the news, I would know when there's a new bill from the server melt down problems alone."

See also 
 Comparison of civic technology platforms
 Civic technology companies
 Civic technology

References

External links 

Participatory democracy
Internet-based activism
Politics and technology
2017 introductions
Mobile technology
Text messaging